Mahamadou Ba (born 21 September 1999) is a Malian professional footballer who plays as a midfielder for Turkish club İstanbulspor on loan from Adana Demirspor.

Career
Ba left his home country of Mali to join BB Erzurumspor in the summer of 2018. In September 2019, he made his debut in the Turkish Cup, playing in a 4–3 win over Edirnespor. Ba made his Süper Lig debut a year later, coming on as a late substitute in a 2–1 victory against Ankaragücü. In October 2020, he joined TFF First League side Bandırmaspor on loan until the end of the season. However, the loan was cut short and he joined Menemenspor on a permanent deal in February 2021.

On 12 January 2023, Ba joined İstanbulspor on loan until the end of the 2022–23 season.

Career statistics

References

External links

1999 births
21st-century Malian people
Living people
Malian footballers
Association football midfielders
Büyükşehir Belediye Erzurumspor footballers
Bandırmaspor footballers
Menemenspor footballers
Adana Demirspor footballers
İstanbulspor footballers
Süper Lig players
TFF First League players
Malian expatriate footballers
Expatriate footballers in Turkey
Malian expatriate sportspeople in Turkey